Usenet is a worldwide, distributed discussion system that uses the Network News Transfer Protocol (NNTP). Programs called newsreaders are used to read and post messages (called articles or posts, and collectively termed news) to one or more newsgroups. Users must have access to a news server to use a newsreader. This is a list of such newsreaders.

Types of clients
 Text newsreader – designed primarily for reading/posting text posts; unable to download binary attachments
 Traditional newsreader – a newsreader with text support that can also handle binary attachments, though less efficiently than more specialized clients
 Binary grabber/plucker – designed specifically for easy and efficient downloading of multi-part binary post attachments; limited or nonexistent reading/posting ability. These generally offer multi-server and multi-connection support. Most now support NZBs, and several either support or plan to support automatic Par2 processing. Some additionally support video and audio streaming.
 NZB downloader – binary grabber client without header support – cannot browse groups or read/post text messages; can only load 3rd-party NZBs to download binary post attachments. Some incorporate an interface for accessing selected NZB search websites.
 Binary posting client – designed specifically and exclusively for posting multi-part binary files
 Combination client – Jack-of-all-trades supporting text reading/posting, as well as multi-segment binary downloading and automatic Par2 processing
Web-Based Client - Client designed for access through a web browser and does not require any additional software to access Usenet.

Active

Commercial software 
 BinTube
 Forté Agent
 NewsBin
 NewsLeecher
 Novell GroupWise
 Postbox
 Turnpike
 Unison
 Usenet Explorer

Freeware 
 GrabIt
 Opera Mail
 Xnews – MS Windows

Free/Open-source software 
 Claws Mail is a GTK+-based email and news client for Linux, BSD, Solaris, and Windows.
 GNOME Evolution
 Gnus, is an email and news client, and feed reader for GNU Emacs.
 Mozilla Thunderbird is a free and open-source cross-platform email client, news client, RSS and chat client developed by the Mozilla Foundation.
Pan a full-featured text and binary NNTP and Usenet client for Linux, FreeBSD, NetBSD, OpenBSD, OpenSolaris, and Windows.
SeaMonkey Mail & Newsgroups
 Sylpheed
 X Python Newsreader

Text-based 
 Alpine
 Gnus (Emacs based)
 Line Mode Browser
 Lynx (has limited Usenet support)
 Mutt (3rd party patches)
 rn
 Slrn
 tin

Web-based 
 Easynews
 Google Groups
 Usenet Archives

Discontinued

Commercial software 

Lotus Notes
 Netscape Communicator (superseded by Mozilla)
Windows Mail – replaced Outlook Express for Windows Vista – terminated by Windows 7
 Windows Live Mail – replaced Outlook Express for Windows XP; optional for Windows XP, Windows Vista, and Windows 7

Freeware 

 MT NewsWatcher – Mac OS X Universal Binary

Free/Open Source 

 Arachne (with aranews.apm package)
 Arena
 Argo (discontinued)
 Beonex Communicator
 KNode (may be embedded in Kontact) 
 Mozilla Mail & Newsgroups (renamed to SeaMonkey)
 Spotnet

Shareware 

 Unison – Mac OS X

Text-based 

 Agora (email server)
 Pine

See also

 Comparison of Usenet newsreaders
 List of newsgroups

References

External links

 

Usenet newsreaders
 List